Fatima Deryan is a Kuwaiti-born Lebanese mountaineer and activist, who currently lives in Dubai, United Arab Emirates. She is the first Lebanese woman  to summit the Mount Everest which she achieved it in 2019. A year which marked many deadliest Mount Everest expeditions.

Biography 
Deryan was born in Kuwait and her family moved to Lebanon when she was two years old. Then her family located permanently in Dubai when she was nine years old.

Career 
She announced her plans in early 2019 to expedite Everest and started the campaign in March 2019 to summit the Mount Everest which was one of her goals of reaching the target of Seven Summits. Despite living in the UAE, she represented her home country Lebanon during the summit. She successfully climbed the Everest on 22 May 2019 making her the first Lebanese woman and second ever person from Lebanon after Maxime Chaya to achieve the feat while also went onto become only the second Arab woman after Suzanne Al Houby of Palestine to achieve the milestone. This was the sixth out of seven mountains in different continents as a part of the Seven Summits which was successfully climbed by her following Denali in North America, Kilimanjaro in Africa, Elbrus in Europe, Puncak Jaya in Oceania and Aconcagua in South America.

In 2018, she founded an online portal for services in the cleaning industry called Yalla Cleaning in UAE. In October 2019, she also supported and joined the Lebanese demonstrations calling for major economic and political reform in Lebanon. In the same month, she also campaigned under the slogan "Wadi hike" regarding creating awareness about the breast cancer in Dubai.

References 

Living people
Summiters of Mount Everest
Lebanese activists
Lebanese mountain climbers
People from Kuwait City
Lebanese expatriates in the United Arab Emirates
Emirati people of Lebanese descent
Year of birth missing (living people)